Tytherington Down is a  biological Site of Special Scientific Interest in Wiltshire, England, notified in 1975.

Sources

 English Nature citation sheet for the site (accessed 8 August 2006)

External links
 English Nature website (SSSI information)

Sites of Special Scientific Interest in Wiltshire
Sites of Special Scientific Interest notified in 1975